Last Laugh, Mr Moto is a 1942 Mr Moto novel by John P. Marquand.

Marquand had not written a Moto novel for a number of years. He wrote one again in 1941, prior to the Japanese attack on Pearl Harbor. After the US declared war on Japan, there was some talk the novel would not be published. However it was decided that Moto was "sufficiently foiled" in his secret service activities in the novel and at the end instead of triumphing he was left "holding the bag". So the novel was published in January 1942.

Plot
Bob Bolles, a beachbomber and former US officer, gets involved in a plot on Mercator Island in the Caribbean.

Reception
The New York Times called it a "thrilling story told with all the artistry at Mr Marquand's command".

References

External links
 
Complete book at Project Gutenberg

1942 American novels
American spy novels
Novels set in the Caribbean
Novels set during World War II